Tantras in Hinduism are esoteric scriptures.

Classes of Hindu Tantra
The word tantra is made up by the joining (sandhi in Sanskrit) of two Sanskrit words: tanoti (expansion) and rayati (liberation). Tantra means liberation of energy and expansion of consciousness from its gross form. It is a method to expand the mind and liberate the dormant potential energy, and its principles form the basis of all yogic practices. Hence, the Hindu Tantra scriptures refer to techniques for achieving a result.

The Hindu Tantras total 92 scriptures; of these, 64 are purely Abheda (literally "without differentiation", or monistic), known as the Bhairava Tantras or Kashmir Śaivite Tantras, 18 are Bhedābheda (literally "with differentiation and without differentiation" monistic or dualistic), known as the Rudra Tantras), and 10 are completely Bheda (literally "differentiated" or dualistic), known as the  Tantras. The latter two (Rudra Tantras and  Tantras) are used by the Śaiva Siddhāntins, and thus are sometimes referred to as Shaiva Siddhanta Tantras, or Śaiva Siddhānta Āgamas.

Tantra are mainly two types: Agama and Nigama. Agamas are those texts in which Goddess asked questions and the God replied. In Nigama texts, God asked questions and Goddess replied. This dialogue between God and Goddess is special feature of Hinduism Tantra.

Origin
In the Nāth Tradition, legend ascribes the origin of Tantra to Dattatreya, a semi-mythological yogi and the assumed author of the Jivanmukta Gita ("Song of the liberated soul"). Matsyendranath is credited with authorship of the Kaulajñāna-nirnāya, a voluminous ninth-century tantra dealing with a host of mystical and magical subjects.  This work occupies an important position in the Hindu tantric lineage, as well as in Tibetan Vajrayana Buddhism.

Function
In distinction to the vedic  ritual, which is traditionally performed out-of-doors without any idols nor emblems, the Tantric ritual is largely a matter of temples and idols. The Tantras are largely descriptions and specifications for the construction and maintenance of temple-structures together with their enclosed idols and lingas—an example of type of text is the Ajita Māhātantra.
Another function was the conservation as state-secrets of texts for use by royalty to maintain their authority through rituals directed to deities controlling the political affairs-of-state—an example of this is the Śārada-tilaka Tantra.

Texts
Tantric texts are usually associated with a particular tradition and deity. The different types of Tantric literature are tantra, Āgama, saṃhitā, sūtra, upaniṣad, purāṇa, tīkā (commentaries), prakaraṇa, paddhati texts, stotram, kavaca, nighaṇṭu, koṣa and hagiographical literature. They are written in Sanskrit and in regional languages. The major textual Tantra traditions with some key exemplary texts is as follows:

Śaiva – Sadaśiva (Śivagama), Vāma or Tumburu, Dakṣiṇa or Bhairava
Kularnava Tantra 
Amṛteṣaṭantra or Netratantra 
Netragyanarṇava tantra
Niḥśvāsatattvasaṃhitā
Kālottārā tantra
Sarvajñānottārā 
Ṣaivāgamas
Raudrāgamas
Bhairavāgamas
Vāma Āgamas
Dakṣiṇāgamas
Śivaśakti traditions – Yāmala (also part of Bhairava tradition)
Brahma yāmala
Rudra yāmala
Skanda yāmala
Viṣṇu yāmala
Yama yāmala
Yāyu yāmala
Kubera yāmala
Indra yāmala

Śākta – Kālī traditions (Kālī, Kālī Viṣṇu, Kāmākhyā/Kubjika, Tārā and Others), Śrīkula tradition
Varahi Tantra 
Shakta Agamas
Muṇḍamālā tantra
Toḍala tantra
Cāmuṇḍa tantra
Devīyāmala
Mādhavakula
Yonigahavara, 
Kālīkulārṇava tantra
Kaṇkālamālinī tantra
Jhaṃkārakaravīra, 
Mahākāla saṃhitā
Kālī tantra
Kālajñāna tantra
Kumārī tantra
Siddhalaharī tantra
Niruttārā tantra
Kālīvilāsa tantra
Utpatti tantra
Kāmadhenu tantra
Nirvāṇa tantra
Kāmākhyā tantra
Tārā tantra
Kaula tantra
Matsya Sūkta / Tārā Kalpa
Samayā tantra
Vāmakeshvara tantra
Tantrajā tantra
Yoginī tantra
Kula - Kulamārga and Other tantras
Kulārṇava tantra
Mahānirvāṇa tantra
Kulacūḍāmaṇi tantra
Kulārṇava tantra
Guptasādhana tantra
Mātṛkābheda tantra
Vaiṣṇava – Vaikhanasas, Pancharatra, bhakti-oriented tantras of Kṛṣṇa and Rāma
Pāñcarātra saṃhitā texts
Ahirbudhnya Saṃhitā
Jayākhya saṃhitā
Pārameśvara saṃhitā
Pauśkara saṃhitā
Pādma saṃhitā
Nāradīya saṃhitā
Haṃsaparameśvara saṃhitā
Lakṣmī tantra
Vaihāyasa saṃhitā
Śrīkālapraā saṃhitā
Vaikhānasa Āgamas
Gautamīya tantra
Bṛhadbrahma saṃhitā
Māheśvara tantra
Sātvata tantra 
Rādhā tantra
Agastya saṃhitā and Dāśarathīya tantra
Īśāna saṃhitā and Ūrdhvāṃnāya saṃhitā
Mantra-śāstra - textbooks on Mantras, metaphysics of mantric sound, related practices and rituals
Prapañcasāra tantra and its commentaries and Ṭīkās
Śāradatilaka tantra by Lakṣmaṇa Deśikendra
Mantramuktāvali of Paramahaṃsa Pūrṇaprakāśa
Mantramahodadhi of Mahīdhara
Mantradevaprakāśikā of Viṣṇudeva
Mantrakamalākara of Kamalākara Bhaṭṭa
Mantraratnākara of Yadunātha Cakravartin
Mantramahārṇava of Mādhava Rāya Vaidya
Tantrasāra of Kṛṣṇānanda āgamvāgiśa
Nibandha - handbooks on ritual worship, sadhana and puja
Kriyākalpataru of śaktinātha Kalyānakara
Kaulāvalīnirṇaya of Jñānānandagiri Paramahaṃsa
śāktanandataraṃgiṇī of Brahmānanda Giri
śāktakrama of Pūrṇānanda
śrītattvacintāmaṇi of Pūrṇānanda
āgamakalpadruma of Govinda
āgamakalpalatikā of Yadunātha
āgamatattvavilāsa of Raghunātha Tarkavāgīśa, and āgamachandrikā of Rāmakṛṣṇa
Tantrachintāmaṇi of Navamīsiṃha
Prāṇatoṣiṇī of Rāmatoṣaṇa Vidyālaṃkāra
Śhivarahasya
Śaivakalpadruma
Saura tantras
Ganapatya tantras
Others – supernatural, chemistry, astrology, alchemy, etc.,

Translations
Most Hindu Tantras remain untranslated. One widely translated exception is the Vijñāna Bhairava Tantra, which according to Christopher Wallis, is atypical of most Tantric scriptures.

Sir John Woodroffe translated the Tantra of the Great Liberation (Mahānirvāna Tantra) (1913) into English along with other Tantric texts. Other tantras which have been translated into a Western language include the Malini-vijayottara tantra, the Kirana tantra, and the Parakhya Tantra.

Some translation of Tantra texts

1. The Kulachudamani Tantra and

Vamkehwar Tantra, Louise M. Finn

2. Kularnava Tantra, Paramhansa Mishra

3. Kularnava Tantra, Ram Rahim Rai

4. Yogini Hridaya, Vraj Vallabh Dwivedi

5. Yogini Tantra by GangaVishnu ShriKrishnadas

6. Maheshwar Tantra Sarala Hindi Vyakhya Sudhakar Malaviya Chowkambha (Narada Pancrata)

7. Kamratna Tantra, Hemchandra Goswami

Tantric Texts Series Arthur Avalon (John Woodroffe)

1. Tantrabhidhanam with Bijanighantu & Mudranighantu - A Tantric Dictionary

2. Shatchakranirupanam (Serpant Power) with 2 commentaries - Taranatha Vaidyaratna

3. Prapachasaratantram (reprinted as volumes 18 & 19)

4. Kulachudamani Tantra - Girish Chandra Vedantatirtha

5. Kularnavatantram edited by Taranatha Vaidyaratna

6. Kalivilasatantram edited by Parvati Charana Tarkatirtha

7. Shrichakrasambhara edited by Kazi Dawa samdup (Buddhist Tantra)

8. Tantraraja Part 1 commentary by Subhagananda Natha

9. Karpuradistotra with intro & commentary by Vimalananda Swami

10. Kamakalavilasa of Punyananda, commentary by Natananadanatha

11. Kaula & Other Upanishads with commentaries by Bhaskararaya & others

12. Tantraraja Part 2 commentary by Subhagananda Natha

13. Mahanirvanatantram with commentary of Hariharananda Bharati

14. Kaulavalinirnayah of Jnanananda Paramahamsa

15. Brahmasamhita with commentary of Jiva Gosvami & Vishnusahasranama

16. Sharadatilakatantram of Lakshmana Desikendra with commentary Part 1

17. Sharadatilakatantram of Lakshmana Desikendra with commentary Part 2

18. Prapachasaratantram Part 1

19. Prapachasaratantram Part 2

20. Chidgaganachandrika - Swami Trivikrama Tirtha

21. Tarabhakti Sudharnava - Panchanana Bhattacharya Tarkaratna

22. Sataratna samgraha, with Sataratnollekhani - Edited by Panchanan Sastri

Notes

See also
 Kashmir Śaivism
 Tantra
 History of Shaktism

References
Lakshmanjoo, Swami. Kashmir Shaivism: The Secret Supreme. 
Dhallapiccola, Anna. Dictionary of Hindu Lore and Legend. 
Walker, Benjamin (1983). Tantrism: Its Secret Principles and Practices. Borgo Press. 
Wallis, Christopher (2013) Tantra Illuminated: The Philosophy, History, and Practice of a Timeless Tradition. Mattamayura Press. 
 
Shiva Shakti Mandalam

Further reading
 

Hindu texts
Tantra
Vajrayana